George Meade (1815–1872) was a U.S. Army major general. General Meade may also refer to:

David C. Meade (1940–2019), U.S. Army major general
Henry J. Meade (1925–2006), U.S. Air Force major general
John Meade (British Army officer) (c. 1775–1849), British Army lieutenant general
Richard John Meade (1821–1894), British Indian Army general

See also
Owen Mead (1892–1942), New Zealand Military Forces major general